Francis Storm Investigates is a British television series which originally aired on ITV in 1960. A former SOE operative sets up as a private detective from his mews house in Kensington.

Main Cast
 Brian Worth as Francis Storm
 William Simons as Robin
 Sarah Long as  Penelope Worth
 Robin Wentworth as Sgt. Pilcher

References

Bibliography
 Pitts, Michael R. Famous Movie Detectives III. Scarecrow Press, 2004.

External links
 

1960 British television series debuts
1960 British television series endings
1960s British drama television series
ITV television dramas
English-language television shows
Television shows produced by Associated-Rediffusion